Castelvetere sul Calore is a comune in the province of Avellino, Campania, southern Italy. It takes its name from the Calore Irpino river that flows nearby.

References

Cities and towns in Campania